James H. Cotter (born October 15, 1974 in Kamloops, British Columbia) is a Canadian curler from Vernon, British Columbia.

Career
Cotter grew up in Kamloops, playing both curling and baseball as a youth. As a high school student, he won three provincial high school championships (1990, 1991, 1993). He won two provincial junior crowns, in 1990 and in 1995. At the 1990 Canadian Junior Curling Championships, he skipped the B.C. team to a 6-5 round robin record. This put them in a five-way tie for third place. They would be eliminated from the playoffs however, when they lost their first tie-breaker match to Nova Scotia's Brian Fowlie. Five years later in his last year of eligibility, Cotter was back, skipping the B.C. team at the 1995 Canadian Junior Curling Championships. This time, he would finish with a better, 7-4 record, but it was only good enough for fourth place, and they missed the playoffs.

After juniors, Cotter would team up with two-time world champion Pat Ryan. Cotter would throw fourth stones for the team, while Ryan called the shots. The team qualified for the 2005 Canadian Olympic Curling Trials, where they went 5-4, missing the playoffs.

After playing with Ryan, Cotter joined up with Bob Ursel. Just like for the Ryan rink, Cotter would throw fourth stones, but let Ursel call the games. This rink won the provincial championship in 2008, qualifying them for the 2008 Tim Hortons Brier in Winnipeg. The team finished with a 7-4 round robin record, but lost to Ontario's Glenn Howard in the 3 vs. 4 playoff match.

Cotter would move up to the skip position for much of the 2010-11 season, while Ursel was nursing a knee injury. The team qualified for the 2011 Tim Hortons Brier without Ursel. They finished with a 4-7 record.

Ursel decided to not play for the following season (and has not played competitively since), and Cotter took control as skip for the full 2011–12 season. Cotter once again skipped Team British Columbia at the Brier in 2012, leading the team to a 4–7 record.

On May 1, 2013, Cotter announced that Olympic champion John Morris would join the team for the 2013–14 season, with Morris as skip, and Cotter throwing last stones. The team managed to win the 2013 Canadian Olympic Curling Pre-Trials, defeating Brad Jacobs in the final, qualifying the rink for the 2013 Canadian Olympic Curling Trials. There, they went on a run, finishing with a 4–3 record, and qualifying for the playoffs. In the playoffs, they defeated 2010 Olympic gold medallist Kevin Martin in the semifinal, facing them off against Team Jacobs once again, who had also qualified through the pre-trials. This time, they could not beat Jacobs, and Jacobs went on to win a gold medal for Canada at the 2014 Winter Olympics. The team had success at the 2014 Tim Hortons Brier, finishing the round robin in a three-way tie for first place with a 9–2 record. In the playoffs, the team won the 1 vs. 2 game against Alberta, skipped by Kevin Koe. This put them in the final where they would play Koe again. They could not beat Koe a second time, and had to settle for second place.

In 2014, Morris left the team, and Cotter resumed skipping responsibilities. Cotter led British Columbia to a 5–6 record at the 2015 Brier and a 3–8 record at the 2016 Brier. In 2016, Morris re-joined the team as their import player, and once again skipped the rink, while Cotter threw fourth stones. The team made it to the 2017 Brier, where they finished with a 7–4 record, but this was not enough to make it to the playoffs. A week later, the team won the 2017 Elite 10 Grand Slam event, Cotter's only career Grand Slam championship to-date. The next season, Morris and Cotter switched positions, with Morris remaining as skip. The team was one of the two qualifiers out of the 2017 Canadian Olympic Curling Pre-Trials. This qualified the team to play in the 2017 Canadian Olympic Curling Trials, where they went 3–5. Morris left the team mid-season.

Cotter coached the South Korean mixed doubles team at the 2018 Winter Olympics.

In 2018, Saskatchewan native Steve Laycock joined the team at third, with Cotter skipping. The team represented B.C. at the 2019 Tim Hortons Brier, where after going 4–3 in the preliminary round, the team lost all of their championship round games, settling for a 4–7 record (8th place). The next season, Laycock took over as skip, be remained at third. At the 2020 Tim Hortons Brier, the team went 2–5 in the preliminary round, and did not qualify for the championship round.

Due to the COVID-19 pandemic in British Columbia, the 2021 provincial championship was cancelled. As the reigning provincial champions, Team Laycock was invited to represent British Columbia at the 2021 Tim Hortons Brier, which they accepted. At the Brier, the team finished with a 3–5 record.

Personal life
Cotter is a graduate of the University College of the Cariboo, and attended Norkam Secondary School in Kamloops. He is employed as health information systems programmer/analyst for Iatric Systems. He is married to Bobbi Cotter and has three children.

Teams

Grand Slam record

References

External links
 CCA profile: Jim Cotter
 

1974 births
Living people
Curlers from British Columbia
Sportspeople from Vernon, British Columbia
Sportspeople from Kamloops
Canadian male curlers
Canadian curling coaches
Canada Cup (curling) participants